Two boats of the United States Navy have borne the name USS Hammerhead, named in honor of the hammerhead shark,  a voracious shark, found in warm seas, with a curious hammerlike head.

United States Navy ship names